Gnaphalium exilifolium, the slender cudweed, is a plant species native to the western United States and northern Mexico. It grows in hilly and mountainous regions in the Black Hills, Rocky Mountains, and other ranges from the states of Chihuahua, Colorado, Kansas, South Dakota, Wyoming, Arizona, New Mexico and Utah.

Gnaphalium exilifolium is an annual herb with several erect to ascending branches. Stems, leaves and phyllaries are covered with a dense coat of woolly hairs, giving the plant a whitish appearance. Flower heads are born in tight glomerules (clumps) along the upper parts of the stems.

References

exilifolium
Flora of Chihuahua (state)
Flora of the Western United States
Plants described in 1899
Flora without expected TNC conservation status